Muriel Bernard (born 24 January 1961) is a French former sport shooter who competed in the 1992 Summer Olympics and in the 1996 Summer Olympics.

References

People from Bourgoin-Jallieu
1961 births
Living people
French female sport shooters
Trap and double trap shooters
Olympic shooters of France
Shooters at the 1992 Summer Olympics
Shooters at the 1996 Summer Olympics
Sportspeople from Isère
20th-century French women